Tammie Jo Shults (born Bonnell; born November 2, 1961) is an American retired commercial airline captain, author, and former naval aviator. She was one of the first female fighter pilots to serve in the United States Navy. Following active duty she became a pilot for Southwest Airlines. She retired from Southwest Airlines in 2020.

On April 17, 2018, as captain of Southwest Airlines Flight 1380, she safely landed a Boeing 737-700 after the aircraft suffered an uncontained engine failure with debris causing rapid decompression of the aircraft.

Early life
Tammie Jo Bonnell was born on November 2, 1961, and grew up on a ranch near Tularosa, New Mexico. As a child, she watched jet aircraft from nearby Holloman Air Force Base practice maneuvers in the skies above her home. Watching these and reading about a missionary pilot, Nate Saint, inspired her to become a pilot too. During her final year of high school, she investigated the possibility of a career in flying but was told that there were no professional women pilots.

Following high school graduation, she attended MidAmerica Nazarene College where she earned degrees in biology and agribusiness, graduating in 1983. While at MidAmerica, she met a woman who had qualified as a pilot for the United States Air Force and decided to see if the Air Force would accept her application for service. After being turned down by the Air Force, she decided to try the Navy while doing graduate studies at Western New Mexico University.

Military career

OCS and flight training
Shults was accepted by the Navy for Aviation Officer Candidate School at Naval Air Station Pensacola. After completing the twelve-week course and receiving her commission as an ensign on June 21, 1985, Shults attended flight training, also at NAS Pensacola, where she trained and qualified for her pilot's wings in the T-34.

Naval aviation instructor
After Pensacola, Shults was stationed at Naval Air Station Chase Field as a flight instructor for the T-2 Buckeye. She later qualified in the A-7 Corsair II with training (RAG) squadron VA-122 at Naval Air Station Lemoore. Her next assignment was VAQ-34, a Tactical Electronic Warfare Squadron at the Pacific Missile Test Center located at Point Mugu, California. When the squadron relocated to NAS Lemoore in 1991, Shults became an instructor under the command of CAPT Rosemary Mariner, the first woman to command an operational air squadron. Shults became one of the first female naval aviators to qualify in the F/A-18 Hornet when the squadron transitioned from the EA-6B Prowler.

Operation Desert Storm
During Operation Desert storm, the Combat Exclusion Policy at that time prevented women from flying combat sorties, so Shults flew training missions as an instructor aggressor pilot for naval aviators. She finished her tour of duty in March 1993.

Navy Reserve, promotion, decorations
In December 1995, she was promoted to lieutenant commander then transitioned to the Navy Reserve, where she flew the F/A-18 Hornet and EA-6B Prowler until August 2001. Her decorations include two Navy and Marine Corps Achievement Medals, a National Defense Service Medal, and a Marksmanship Medal.

Civilian career
After leaving the Navy, Shults joined Southwest Airlines as a pilot, flying a part-time schedule of 8–10 days per month so that she could also raise a family following her marriage to fellow naval aviator Dean Shults.

Southwest Airlines Flight 1380

On April 17, 2018, while Shults was the captain commanding Flight 1380 from New York to Dallas, an engine fan blade on the Boeing 737 failed and flying debris damaged the left side of the fuselage and one side window; the window failed, causing the plane to decompress. One passenger, Jennifer Riordan, was partially sucked through the damaged window and was later pronounced dead at the hospital. Shults made an emergency descent and landed in Philadelphia. Her actions, calm demeanor, and competence during the emergency were noted by Southwest Airlines officials and passengers as well as Chesley Sullenberger, another commercial airline and former military pilot who controlled a similar situation in 2009 on US Airways Flight 1549.

Shults later revealed that she had not intended to be the pilot of that flight, but had swapped the shift with her husband.

U.S. Representative and former US Air Force colonel and pilot Martha McSally introduced a resolution in Congress to honor Shults for her life-saving heroism and skill in landing her badly disabled aircraft.

On December 10, 2020, Shults was inducted into the International Air & Space Hall of Fame.

Personal life
In 1994, she married Dean Shults, at the time a fellow naval aviator in the A-7 Corsair II, who also joined Southwest Airlines as a pilot that year. Together, they have two children. The couple live in Boerne, Texas. Shults is a devout Christian who teaches Sunday school and helps the needy, such as internally displaced persons from Hurricane Rita.

Shults wrote a book about Southwest Airlines flight 1380, Nerves of Steel, which was released in the United States on October 8, 2019.

References

External links

Living people
Aviators from New Mexico
MidAmerica Nazarene University alumni
Military personnel from New Mexico
Survivors of aviation accidents or incidents
United States Naval Flight Officers
Western New Mexico University alumni
Military personnel from San Antonio
United States Navy reservists
Female United States Navy officers
Southwest Airlines people
People from Tularosa, New Mexico
1961 births
American women commercial aviators
Women United States Naval Aviators
21st-century American women